Last of the Comanches is a 1953 American Western film directed by Andre DeToth and starring Broderick Crawford, Barbara Hale, Johnny Stewart and Lloyd Bridges. The film is a remake of the 1943 World War II film Sahara, starring Humphrey Bogart. Lloyd Bridges appeared in both films.

Plot

In 1876 all the Indians are at peace except the Comanches lead by Black Cloud. When he wipes out a complete town, leaving only burnt-out ruins, just six soldiers are left and they retreat into the desert, hoping to reach the safety of Fort Macklin. But it is at least 100 miles away, and they are short of water. They are reinforced by members of a stagecoach and find limited water at a deserted mission. Pinned down by Black Cloud they send an Indian boy who was a prisoner on to the fort for reinforcements, while they fight off Black Cloud. He is also suffering from lack of water and they try to delay him with (bogus) offers of water until the cavalry can arrive to rescue them. The stagecoach is carrying a consignment of dynamite and this is used to lay a trap for the marauding Indians – a truly spectacular explosion ensues…

Cast

Comic book adaption
 Avon Periodicals: Last of the Comanches (1953)

References

External links
 
 
 
 

1953 Western (genre) films
1953 films
American Western (genre) films
Columbia Pictures films
Films scored by George Duning
Films directed by Andre DeToth
Films based on Patrol
Siege films
Films adapted into comics
1950s English-language films
1950s American films